Khanyisa Chawane (born 14 January 1996) is a South African netball player. She was selected to represent the South African netball team at the 2019 Netball World Cup.

References

1996 births
Living people
People from Tzaneen
South African netball players
2019 Netball World Cup players
Team Bath netball players
Netball Superleague players
South African expatriate sportspeople in England
Sportspeople from Limpopo